Pseudupeneus maculatus, the spotted goatfish, is a species from the family Mullidae. The species was originally described by Marcus Elieser Bloch in 1793. It occurs in the western Atlantic Ocean.

References

Mullidae
Fish of the Atlantic Ocean
Taxa named by Marcus Elieser Bloch
Fish described in 1793